Wei Shaozhen (August 2, 1918 – December 9, 2006) better known by his pen name Wei Huangnu, was a Chinese translator and professor.

He was among the first few in China who translated the works of Nikolay Nekrasov's into Chinese language.

Early life 
Wei was born as Shao Zhen in Wuji County, Hebei, China on August 2, 1918.

Education 
During his early years, Wei learned Esperanto by himself.

Wei graduated from Zunyi Foreign Studies College in 1940, where he majored in Russian language.

Career 
In 1938, Wei started to public sh his wo ks.
Wei worked in Fenglin Literature and Art and Poetry and Literature as the chief editor.

Wei joined the China Writers Association in 1949.

After the founding of the Communist State, Wei became a professor at Peking University.

He died in 2006.

Works
 Lizhaiyumo
 Poetry of Czech Republic
 Collected Stories of Czech Republic
 Poetry of Russian
 Poetry of Nekrasov (Nikolay Nekrasov)
 Collected Works of Nekrasov (Nikolay Nekrasov)
 Poetry of Decemberrists

Awards
 Collected Works of Nekrasov – National Foreign Literature Book Award
 Chinese Translation Association – Senior Translator (2004)

References

1918 births
2006 deaths
People from Shijiazhuang
Writers from Hebei
People's Republic of China translators
Russian–Chinese translators
20th-century Chinese translators
21st-century Chinese translators
Academic staff of Peking University